Nathan Newman Boothe (born February 3, 1994) is an American professional basketball player who last played for Darüşşafaka of the Turkish Basketball Super League. He played college basketball for the Toledo.

Early life and high school
Boothe grew up in Gurnee, Illinois and attended Warren Township High School. In his senior season, Boothe averaged 14.4 points, 7.5 rebounds, ands 2.5 blocks per game. For most of his time in high school Boothe struggled with weight, reaching up to 285 pounds by his senior year, which drove away many potential offers from college coaches. He ultimately committed to play for the University of Toledo, who offered him their only available scholarship for the class of 2012.

College career
Boothe was a four-year starter for the Toledo Rockets. Boothe was named to the Mid-American Conference (MAC) All-Freshman team after his first season. He averaged 10 points, 5.7 rebounds, and 2.2 assists per game in as a junior and was named honorable mention All-MAC. As a senior, Boothe led the MAC with 19.3 points per game, finished third in the league with 9.0 rebounds per game, and averaged 3.3 assists and was named first team All-MAC. Along with LSU's Ben Simmons, Boothe was one of two players in Division I to average at least 19 points, nine rebounds, and three assists during the 2015–16 season. He finished his collegiate career as Toledo's all-time leader in blocked shots with 155, tied for 10th (now 11th) with 1,494 points, and tied for 10th with 777 rebounds.

Professional career
After going unselected in the 2016 NBA draft, Boothe played on Miami Heat's NBA Summer League team but ultimately was not invited to preseason training camp.

Pistoia
Boothe signed with The Flexx Pistoia of the Italian Lega Basket Serie A (LBA) on June 27, 2016. In his first professional season, Boothe averaged 11 points, 4.5 rebounds and 1.4 assists in 32 games. Following the season he played in the 2017 NBA Summer League as a member of the Brooklyn Nets team. He averaged 6.6 points and two rebounds over five games and was not offered a spot on the Nets preseason roster.

Sakarya
Boothe signed with Sakarya Büyükşehir Belediyesi S.K. of the Turkish Basketball Super League (BSL) on July 11, 2017. He averaged 9.5 points, 4.9 rebounds and 1.4 assists in 31 BSL games.

Oldenburg
Boothe signed with EWE Baskets Oldenburg of the German Basketball Bundesliga (BBL) on June 6, 2018. Boothe appeared in all 34 of EWE Baskets' regular season games off the bench, averaging 12.2 points, 4.6 rebounds, 1.0 assists, and 1.2 blocks per game (2nd-highest in the BBL) as the team finished second in the league.

Darüşşafaka
Boothe signed with Darüşşafaka of the Turkish Basketball Super League on July 18, 2021. Darüşşafaka also plays in the Basketball Champions League.

Personal life
Boothe's father, Mark Boothe, played baseball at Northern Illinois University and is the school's all-time and single season leader in batting average. His brother David played offensive line for the football team at Hope College and his sister, Sarah, was named Ms. Basketball for Illinois and played collegiately at Stanford and now plays professionally in Australia.

References

External links
Toledo Rockets bio
RealGM profile
EuroBasket profile

1994 births
Living people
American expatriate basketball people in Germany
American expatriate basketball people in Italy
American expatriate basketball people in Turkey
American men's basketball players
Basketball players from Illinois
Centers (basketball)
Darüşşafaka Basketbol players
EWE Baskets Oldenburg players
People from Gurnee, Illinois
Pistoia Basket 2000 players
Power forwards (basketball)
Sakarya BB players
Sportspeople from the Chicago metropolitan area
Toledo Rockets men's basketball players